"Ce n'était qu'un rêve" (meaning "Nothing But a Dream" or "It Was Only a Dream") is a French-language song by Canadian singer Celine Dion. It is her debut single, released on 11 June 1981 in Quebec, Canada and included on her first album, La voix du bon Dieu (1981). "Ce n'était qu'un rêve" was written by Dion, her mother Thérèse and brother Jacques, and produced by Daniel Hétu and René Angélil. The single reached number eight in Quebec. In 2005, "Ce n'était qu'un rêve" was featured on Dion's greatest hits compilation, On ne change pas.

Background
At age 12, Dion collaborated with her mother Thérèse and brother Jacques to write and compose her first song, "Ce n'était qu'un rêve". Dion's brother Michel sent the recording to music manager René Angélil, whose name he discovered on the back of a Ginette Reno album. Angélil was moved by Dion's voice and decided to help her. On 19 June 1981, she made her first broadcast appearance. Dion performed "Ce n'était qu'un rêve" in a popular talk show in Quebec, Canada hosted by Michel Jasmin. After releasing the single in Quebec by Les Disques Showbizz in 1981, it was also issued in France by Pathé Records in 1982.

Commercial performance
On 29 August 1981, the song entered the chart in Quebec, spending six weeks on it and peaking at number eight.

Live performances
Dion performed "Ce n'était qu'un rêve" live many times during her career. It was included on The Colour of My Love Concert VHS/DVD (1995). A short version was featured on Au cœur du stade CD (1999), Au cœur du stade DVD (1999), and Céline une seule fois / Live 2013 CD/DVD (2014).

Track listings and formats
Canadian 7" single
"Ce n'était qu'un rêve" – 3:46
"Ce n'était qu'un rêve" (Instrumental Version) – 3:46

French 7" single
"Ce n'était qu'un rêve" – 3:46
"L'amour viendra" – 4:20

Charts

References

1981 debut singles
1981 songs
Celine Dion songs
French-language songs
Song recordings produced by Eddy Marnay
Songs written by Celine Dion
Song recordings produced by René Angélil